The Percy Sykes Stakes, registered as the Keith Mackay Handicap, is an Australian Turf Club Group 2 Thoroughbred horse race, for two-year-old fillies, at set weights with penalties, over a distance of 1200 metres, held at Randwick Racecourse in Sydney, Australia in the autumn during the ATC Championships series. It is run on the same day as the Sydney Cup. Total prize money for the race is A$1,000,000.

History
The registered racename is named in honour of the former AJC Chairman Keith Mackay.

In 2014 the ATC substantially increased the prizemoney and the race was scheduled as part of the ATC Championships series and renamed the race to the Royal Randwick Stakes.
In 2015 the race was once again renamed in honour of the veterinarian Percy Sykes (1920–2014), who had saved Tulloch and had worked with famous trainers in the industry, including T J Smith, Bart Cummings, Gai Waterhouse and Jack Denham.

Name
1960–2013 -  Keith Mackay Handicap 
 2014 -  Royal Randwick Stakes 
 2015 onwards - Percy Sykes Stakes

Grade

1960–1978 -  Principal Race
1979–2013 -  Listed Race
2014–2016 -  Group 3
2017 onwards - Group 2

Distance
1960–1969 - 6 furlongs (~1200 metres)
1970–1971 - 7 furlongs (~1400 metres)
1972–1983 - 1,200 metres
1984–1985 - 1,400 metres
1986 onwards - 1,200 metres

Winners

2022 - Paris Dior
2021 - Jamaea
2020 - Away Game
2019 - Anaheed
2018 - Pure Elation
2017 - Shoals
2016 - Missrock
2015 - Ottoman
2014 - Eloping
2013 - Everage
2012 - Single Style 
2011 - Streama 
2010 - Golden Millennium 
2009 - Readyor     
2008 - Shoboard  
2007 - Sliding Cube   
2006 - Catechuchu  
2005 - Blizzardly 
2004 - Strawberry Storm  
2003 - Bella Corona  
2002 - Before Too Long 
2001 - Allez France 
2000 - Actress 
1999 - Katima   
1998 - Emotive   
1997 - Snapshots   
1996 - Law Of Logic  
1995 - Ginzano   
1994 - Alouette  
1993 - Miss Prospect   
1992 - Flitter   
1991 - Dangerous Seam   
1990 - Rhythmic Charm   
1989 - Dazzling Flyer   
1988 - Paris Weekend    
1987 - The Cloisters    
1986 - Magic Flute    
1985 - Zipella    
1984 - †Stater / Dinky Flyer   
1983 - Lady Eclipse   
1982 - I Like Diamonds    
1981 - Circle Of Song    
1980 - Gay Rosalind   
1979 - Charity    
1978 - Impede   
1977 - Red Cat    
1976 - †Fleet Princess / Truly Brave    
1975 - La Stupenda    
1974 - Catkin   
1973 - Favoured   
1972 - Admire   
1971 - Kiss Me Cait   
1970 - Tumberlua    
1969 - Obelia   
1968 - Miss Mink    
1967 - Surre Queen    
1966 - Candy Floss    
1965 - Lone   
1964 - Anemone    
1963 - Constant Image   
1962 - April Wonder   
1961 - Cymbal   
1960 - Primrose Lane    

† Run in Divisions

See also
 List of Australian Group races
 Group races

External links
 Royal Randwick Stakes (ATC)

References

Horse races in Australia